James Clark (24 March 1925 – 17 August 2013) was an Australian rules footballer for Carlton in the Victorian Football League (VFL).

Clark made his VFL debut in round 7, 1943 against Melbourne Football Club at Carlton's home ground Princes Park, and played in two premiership teams; the infamous 1945 "Bloodbath" Grand Final against South Melbourne, and the one-point victory against  in 1947 in which he was generally considered Carlton's best player on the ground for his strong defensive and dashing rebound play in the backline. Clark won Carlton's best and fairest award in 1951 and promptly retired from VFL football to accept the captain-coach role with Bendigo Football League's Echuca Football Club.

Clark represented Victoria five times.

References

External links

 
 
 Jim Clark at Blueseum

Carlton Football Club players
Carlton Football Club Premiership players
John Nicholls Medal winners
Australian rules footballers from Victoria (Australia)
1925 births
2013 deaths
Two-time VFL/AFL Premiership players